Savoyard with a Marmot is an oil-on-canvas painting of 1716 by the French Rococo artist Jean-Antoine Watteau (1684–1721). It depicts an itinerant musician/raconteur from Savoy. The painting depicts his clarinet and his trained companion marmot. Savoyards were known to utilize the animals at traveling shows and local fairs, having trained them to "tell fortunes" by pulling carded predictions from a hat. "Lied des Marmottenbuben" by Goethe, and Les deux petits savoyards both depict this. The painting is said to depict the Savoyard's disassociation and loneliness; Savoy was a poor region, and emigres were often marginal outcasts within the lands they decamped for. Earlier, in 1715, Watteau had drawn an older Savoy woman with her boxed marmot in "Standing Savoyarde with a Marmot Box", before expanding the depth of the depiction with this work.

The painting was a part of Catherine the Great's collection, before transferring to the Hermitage Museum.

References

1710s paintings
Paintings by Antoine Watteau
Paintings in the collection of the Hermitage Museum